Golconda Marina State Recreation Area is an Illinois state park on  in Pope County, Illinois, United States.

References

State parks of Illinois
Protected areas of Pope County, Illinois